Franklin Township, Nebraska may refer to the following places:

 Franklin Township, Butler County, Nebraska
 Franklin Township, Fillmore County, Nebraska

See also: Franklin Township (disambiguation)

Nebraska township disambiguation pages